Dennis Riccio (born c. 1946) is a former American football and wrestling coach.  He served as the head football coach at Frostburg State University in Frostburg, Maryland 1987 to 1991 and at St. Lawrence University in Canton, New York from 1992 to 1997, compiling a career college football record of 42–62.  Before his stint at Frostburg State, Riccio was the defensive coordinator at Augustana College in Rock Island, Illinois under head coach Bob Reade from 1983 to 1986, during which time the Augustana Vikings won four consecutive NCAA Division III Football Championships.  Ricco played college football at Illinois State University as a linebacker from 1964 to 1966. Riccio also wrestled at Illinois State.  He moved to Augusta in 1979 to become head wrestling coach and assistant football coach.  He served as head wrestling  coach there from 1979 to 1987, tallying a record of 63–56–3.

Head coaching record

Football

References

Year of birth uncertain
1940s births
Living people
American football linebackers
Augustana (Illinois) Vikings football coaches
Augustana (Illinois) Vikings wrestling coaches
Frostburg State Bobcats football coaches
Illinois State Redbirds football players
Illinois State Redbirds wrestlers
St. Lawrence Saints football coaches